Procacitas is a genus of moths of the family Incurvariidae. It contains only one species, Procacitas orientella, which is found in Japan (Hokkaido, Honshu, Shikoku), Russia (Sakhalin, Irkutsk, Primorye) and North Korea.

The wingspan is 13–14 mm for males and 11.5–15 mm for females. The forewings are dark brown with a purple tinge and a silvery white band.

The larvae feed on Pyrola incarnata. They create an elliptical case consisting of two pieces of the same size.

References

Определитель насекомых Дальнего Востока России. Т. V. Ручейники и чешуекрылые Ч.1. / под общ.ред. П. А. Лера. — Владивосток: «Дальнаука», 1997. — С. 290. — 540 с. — 500 экз. — 

Incurvariidae
Monotypic moth genera
Moths of Asia
Adeloidea genera
Moths described in 1987